'
Paragus  angustifrons (Loew 1863), the Narrow-faced Grass Skimmer, is an uncommon species of syrphid fly observed throughout North America. Hoverflies can remain nearly motionless in flight. The adults are also known as flower flies for they are commonly found on flowers from which they get both energy-giving nectar and protein-rich pollen. The larvae have been reared from Aphis spiraecola and Aphis spiraephila.

References

Syrphinae
Articles created by Qbugbot
Insects described in 1863